Ballet Chancers was an Irish television programme broadcast on RTÉ One in late 2008. Featuring the ballerina, Monica Loughman, it began on 16 November 2008. In the show Loughman attempts to turn six streetwise hip hop dancers into elegant ballet dancers over a period of four months. At the end of the show they may, if successful, partake in a performance of The Nutcracker with Loughman's own company, The Irish Youth Russian Ballet Company which took place in the 21 December finale.

Chancers
Six chancers participate in the show, three of each sex.

Episodes
The first episode was broadcast on 16 November 2008.

References

External links
 Ballet Chancers
 RTÉ Guide Interview with Loughman
 Monica Loughman's Ballet Chancers

2008 Irish television series debuts
Ballet in Ireland
Dance television shows
Irish talent shows
RTÉ original programming
2008 Irish television series endings